The United States competed at the 1900 Summer Olympics in Paris, France.

Medalists

 Additionally, Foxhall Parker Keene and Frank MacKey were part of the mixed team that won the gold medal in polo.
 Additionally, Walter McCreery was part of the mixed team that won the silver medal in polo, and Basil Spalding de Garmendia won a silver medal with Max Décugis of France in men's doubles tennis.
 Additionally, Marion Jones won a bronze medal with Laurence Doherty of Great Britain in mixed doubles tennis.

Results by event

Athletics

The United States team took 16 of the 23 track & field athletics medals, having competed in 22 events (all except the 5000 metre team race). The Americans failed to win a medal in only 3 of the 22 events they contested—the marathon and the two steeplechase events. Kraenzlein won four gold medals while Baxter and Tewksbury led in total medals with five each. Most of the American team did not compete at the events scheduled for Sundays.

 Track and road events

 Field events

Cycling

The United States' first cycling appearance was at the second Olympic cycling competition, 1900.  One cyclist from the United States competed in both events, winning the bronze medal in the 2000 metre sprint to become the only cyclist from outside France to win a medal.

Track

Fencing

The United States first competed in fencing at the Olympics in the sport's second appearance. The nation sent two fencers.

Golf

The United States was one of four nations to compete in the first Olympic golf events.  The Americans took both gold medals, as well as sweeping the women's competition to take 4 of 6 total medals.

Polo

The United States was one of four nations to compete in the first Olympic polo event.  Americans played on two of the five teams, each time along with British companions.  The two American/British combinations won the top two prizes.

Rowing

The United States had one boat at the debut of Olympic rowing; the Vesper Boat Club eight took gold.

Sailing

The United States had two boats in the first Olympic sailing competitions. MacHenry's Frimousse competed in both races of the 3–10 ton class as well as the open class, Taylor is listed as a crew member for the 3–10 ton races despite owning a different boat in the competition. The bronze medal in the second race is thus often listed as a mixed team medal, as Taylor was British/Australian. Another boat, Singy, competed in the open class with unknown crew. Harry Van Bergen won a bronze medal by himself in the 20+ ton class.

Swimming

For the second Games, the United States had one swimmer compete and won no medals.

Tennis

The United States was one of four countries to compete in tennis in 1900. It was the nation's first appearance in the sport. Three men and two women competed. Marion Jones took bronze in the women's singles due to a first-round bye and a loss to gold medalist Cooper. The United States also had two medals—a silver and a bronze—as part of mixed teams.

References

Nations at the 1900 Summer Olympics
1900
Olympics